El Etmish Kutluk Bilge was a khagan of the Turgesh.

Early life 
He was born Tumodu (都摩度) in the Black Turgesh tribe. He was a high-ranking general in Suluk's army, however his name can be a title as well. After Baga Tarkhan's coup, he supported Suluk's son Kut Chor in Suyab.

Reign 
After Baga Tarkhan's fall, he was acknowledged as khagan by Xuanzong on 26 July 744. It is not known when he died. He was followed by Yibo.

References 

8th-century Turkic people
Türgesh khagans
8th-century rulers in Asia